Shraddha may refer to:

In religion 
 Śrāddha, a Hindu ritual performed for one's ancestors who left their spiritual body(the parents are still a living entity called Pitru)
 Śraddhā, the Sanskrit term used to refer to faith in Buddhism, faith in Hinduism

Given name 
 Shraddha Arya (born 1987), Indian actress
 Shraddha Chavan (born 1988), Maharashtrian cricketer
 Shraddha Dangar (born 1994), Indian actress
 Shraddha Das (born 1987), Indian actress
 Shraddha Jadhav (born c.1964), Indian politician, mayor of Mumbai 2009–2012
 Shraddha Kapoor (born 1987), Indian actress
 Shraddha Musale (born 1984), Indian actress
 Shraddha Nigam (born 1979), Indian actress
 Shraddha Ram, Hindu missionary
 Shraddha Sharma (born 1995), Indian singer
 Shraddha Shashidhar (born 1996), Indian beauty pageant winner
 Shraddha Srinath (born 1990), Indian film actress

Other uses 
 Shraddha (TV series), an Indian soap opera, on air from 2009 to 2010
 Shraddha TV, a Sri Lankan television station with Buddhist content
 Shraddha Rehabilitation Foundation, an Indian non-profit organization

See also 
 Shraddha Pandit (born 1982), Indian playback singer